King of the North is the third EP by UK grime rapper Bugzy Malone. The EP was released on 14 July 2017 by Ill Gotten Records, which is an independent record label set up by Malone.

The album consists of eight tracks and was released after Malone's Part 2 Fire in the Booth on BBC Radio 1 Xtra with Charlie Sloth. It was certified silver by the British Phonographic Industry (BPI) recognising album equivalent sales of 60,000+. The album had three charting singles, "Through the Night", "Memory Lane" and "Bruce Wayne", charting at numbers 92, 74 and 99, respectively.

The guest appearances for the album include Tom Grennan, Shola Ama and DJ Luck & MC Neat. All songs on the album were classified as explicit. The main producers on the album were DJ Luck, Shift K3Y and Z.Dot. Others producers involved were Ali Karim, S-X and Toddla T. For the music videos uploaded for the album, the directors were Connor Hamilton, G.Kuba and Wayne Lennox.

Track listing

Charts

Certifications

References

2017 EPs
Bugzy Malone albums